The 3rd Division of the Estonian Army, was one of the three Estonian divisions created during the Estonian War of Independence, which was active till the Soviet occupation of Estonia. Since the restoration of independence in 1991 there are no divisions currently among the Estonian Defence Forces.

The division's first commander was Ernst Põdder.

History
The 3rd  Division staff was based in Tallinn. Since February 1, 1940, the division was made up by the Harju Military District and Lääne-Saare Military District.

Order of battle
The unit order of battle in 1939:
Automobile-Tank Regiment
6th Single Infantry Battalion
9th Single Infantry Battalion
10th Single Infantry Battalion
Sakala Partisan Battalion
Kalev Single Infantry Battalion
Scouts Single Infantry Battalion
Engineering Battalion
Signal Battalion
5th Artillery Group

See also
1st Division
2nd Division
4th Division
1st Infantry Brigade

References

Divisions of Estonia
Estonian War of Independence
Military units and formations established in 1920
1920 establishments in Estonia
Military units and formations disestablished in 1940